Misbehaving Mums To Be is a BBC Three series following a team of midwives as they take pregnant women who binge drink, chain smoke and overeat and help them get back into shape before they give birth.

List of Episodes 

BBC Television shows